Baglan Dragons Association Football Club is a Welsh football team based in Baglan, Port Talbot, Wales. They play in the Ardal SW, which is in the third tier of the Welsh football league system.

History

The club were formerly known as Red Dragon & Baglan and played in the South Wales Amateur League, and were Division Two champions in the 2002–03 season. In 2004 the club changed its name to Baglan Red Dragons and 2009 changed to Baglan Dragons. The club were relegated from Division One at the end of the 2010–11 season, but regained their place in Division One at the end of the following season after a third-place finish in Division Two.

In 2015–16 the club joined the South Wales Alliance League Division One in its inaugural season and obtained promotion in the first season, finishing as runners-up.

Honours
South Wales Amateur League Premier Division: – Champions: 2021–22
South Wales Alliance League Division One: – Runners-up: 2015–16
South Wales Amateur League Division Two: – Champions: 2002–03
FAW Trophy – Runners-up: 2021–22

References

External links
Club official twitter
Club official facebook

Football clubs in Wales
South Wales Alliance League clubs
South Wales Amateur League clubs
Port Talbot
Sport in Port Talbot
Ardal Leagues clubs